Mbira DzeNharira was formed by Tendayi Gahamadze in 1987 in Norton, a town 40 km west of Harare. To date they have released 11 CD and 3 DVD albums.

Background
Mbira dzeNharira revolutionized the sound of mbira by electrifying and rearranging the instruments into bass baritone, rhythm and lead mbira. The ancient 22 key mbira dzavadzimu was a three octave instrument with the keys on the right standing for lead keys, on the upper left is the rhythm section, and on the bottom left is the bass section.

This made it possible for one mbira player to be able to perform solo at ceremonies and gatherings, and sometimes it could be two or three players rotating on those three octaves.

Mbira DzeNharira  decided to increase the number of octave to six using four mbiras on the mbira dzavadzimu.

Complex rhythms were born and mbira music took a more vibrant and multi rhythmic style which completely changed the sound.

The current members of the group who have been together for eleven years are Tendayi Gahamadze who composes, sings and plays the baritone mbira ( Dongonda), Clemmence Rice who plays the bass mbira (Nhovapasi), Takawira Devera who plays lead mbira (Nheketo) and Tendai (Netombo) Kazuru who plays shakers ( hosho). All the players of instruments except the bass man are  also singers.

As the group ages it matures more in depths of Shona music.

Mbira dzeNharira is an ancient style of music. It consists of Shona musical repertoires, folk tales and Spirit composed music. It is spiritual and can be played at traditional ceremonies, it has preserved the Shona culture and traditions through its art work.

Discography

CD albums

Rine Manyanga Hariputirwe
Gomo Remandiriri
Kudya Kwenzeve
Tozvireva Tingaputike Neshungu
Toita Zverudo
Gonamombe Rerume
Fare Fare Tindike
 Pfora
Nyamubvambire Wamuka
Dziva Renjuzu
Bvungurungwi KwaWaze
Chivimbanamuyeni

DVD albums

Rwendo Rwekure
Fare Fare Tindike
Dziva Renjuzu

See also
 List of mbira players
 Tendayi Gahamadze

References

External links 
 Mbira dzeNharira PDF file

Zimbabwean musical groups